Dalton Freeman (born June 18, 1990) is an American football center who is currently a free agent. He was signed by the New York Jets as an undrafted free agent in 2013. He played college football at Clemson.

A native of Pelion, South Carolina, Freeman attended Pelion High School, where he was an All-American offensive lineman. Regarded as a four-star recruit by Rivals.com, Freeman was ranked as the No. 13 offensive guard in his class.

Professional career

New York Jets
Freeman was signed by the New York Jets as an undrafted free agent on April 29, 2013. Freeman was released on August 28, 2013. Freeman was signed to the Jets' practice squad on September 1, 2013.

Freeman was waived by the Jets on August 30, 2015.

Buffalo Bills
Freeman was claimed off waivers from the Buffalo Bills on September 1, 2015. He was released by the Bills on September 5, 2015.

Houston Texans
Freeman was signed to the Texans' practice squad on November 24, 2015. On September 3, 2016, he was waived/injured by the Texans. He was released from injured reserve on September 12.

Buffalo Bills (second stint)
Freeman was signed to the Bills' practice squad on November 14, 2016.

References

External links 
Buffalo Bills bio
New York Jets bio
Clemson Tigers bio

1990 births
Living people
People from Lexington County, South Carolina
Players of American football from South Carolina
American football centers
Clemson Tigers football players
New York Jets players
Buffalo Bills players